Jean Hamburger  (15 July 1909 – 1 February 1992) was a French physician, surgeon and essayist. He is particularly known for his contribution to nephrology, and for having performed the first renal transplantation in France in 1952.

Biography
Hamburger was born to a Jewish family in Paris. Together with René Kuss, Hamburger defined the precise methods and rules for conducting renal transplantation surgery and is attributed with founding the medical discipline of nephrology. In 1952, at Necker Hospital in Paris, he performed the first successful renal transplant surgery in France, on a 16-year-old carpenter, Marius Renard who damaged his only kidney when he fell off scaffolding, using a kidney donated by the subject's mother. The organ failed, but the rejection was staved off for three weeks, a record at the time. In 1955, he created the very first artificial kidney. Hamburger is credited with major breakthroughs in renal transplants: first prolonged success in 1953, first unqualified success between twins in 1959 and non-twins in 1962.
He also authored basic research on the immunological basis of kidney disease, graft immunology and auto-immune diseases.

Personal life
Hamburger married concert pianist Annette Haas and had 3 children - Michel, Bernard and Françoise. His son Michel was the well-known French singer-songwriter, Michel Berger. His grandson Raphael Hamburger is a French music supervisor.

In the 1950s, Hamburger contracted a lung infection which weakened him severely. He died on 1 February 1992 in Paris. Just six months later, on 2 August 1992, his son Michel Berger died suddenly of a massive heart attack.

Published works
1972  La Puissance et la Fragilité  (Flammarion)
1975  Dictionnaire de médecine, préface et direction  (Flammarion)
1976  L’Homme et les Hommes  (Flammarion)
1979  Demain, les autres  (Flammarion)
1981  Un jour, un homme...  (Flammarion)
1982  Introduction au langage de la médecine  (Flammarion)
1983  Le journal d’Harvey  (Flammarion)
1984  La Raison et la Passion  (Le Seuil)
1985  Le Dieu foudroyé  (Flammarion)
1986  Le Miel et la Ciguë  (Le Seuil)
1988  Monsieur Littré  (Flammarion)
1988  La plus belle aventure du monde  (Gallimard)
1988  Zouchy et quelques autres histoires   (Flammarion)
1989  Dictionnaire promenade  (Le Seuil)
1990  La Puissance et la Fragilité. Vingt ans après  (Flammarion)
1990  Le Livre de l’aventure humaine  (Gallimard)
1991  Les Belles Imprudences, Réflexion sur la condition humaine  (Odile Jacob)

Honours and awards
He was elected to life membership to Seat 4 of the Académie française on 18 April 1985, succeeding Pierre Emmanuel, in an official ceremony which took place on 16 January 1986. Upon his death, Cardinal Albert Decourtray was elected to fill his seat on 1 July 1993.

Member of the Académie Nationale de Médecine
Grand officier de la Légion d'honneur
Grand officier de l'ordre national du Mérite
Commandeur des Arts et des Lettres

External links
Académie française biography
RFI Musique – biography of Michel Berger

References

1909 births
1992 deaths
Physicians  from Paris
French nephrologists
French medical writers
French Resistance members
Commandeurs of the Ordre des Arts et des Lettres
Grand Officiers of the Légion d'honneur
Grand Officers of the Ordre national du Mérite
Members of the Académie Française
Members of the French Academy of Sciences
Lycée Carnot alumni
University of Paris alumni
Jewish physicians
20th-century French Jews
French transplant surgeons
20th-century French physicians